Abbas Vaez Tabasi (25 June 1935 – 4 March 2016) was an influential Iranian cleric who held memberships at different institutions. He was Grand Imam and Chairman of the Astan Quds Razavi board from 1979 until his death in 2016.

Early life
Vaez Tabasi hails from a family of Mashhadi origin. He was born on 25 June 1935. He began his education when he was only 12 years old  in various seminaries.

Career
Vaez Tabasi was a member of Islamic Republican Party's central council, the Expediency Discernment Council and the Assembly of Experts of the Islamic Republic of Iran. He was also the head of the Astan Quds Razavi.

In 2006 he was elected to the Assembly of Experts to the surprise of some observers. However, he retired after declining to run in 2016 election.

Personal life
Vaez Tabasi's daughter married Supreme Leader Khamenei's son, Sayyid Hassan.

Illness and death
On 2 November 2015, it was announced that he was suffering from cancer. On 27 February 2016, he was hospitalized due to respiratory complications. After a few days of hospitalization, Vaez died on 4 March. He died at the age of 80. Following his death, three days mourning was declared in Khorasan province. His funeral was held on the following day which Ali Khamenei and other officials like President Hassan Rouhani attending the ceremony. He was buried at the Imam Reza shrine.

Revolutionary activities 
Vaez Tabassi, Ali Khamenei and Syed Abdul Karim Hashemi Nejad were the core of clerics in Mashhad revolutionary activities revolving around the Holy shrine of Imam Reza they manage. He was heavily influenced by the Navvab Safavi during the years 1952 to 1955 in his speeches against the Pahlavi regime takeoff and The speech was prohibited again in 1955 and I continued until the fall of the Pahlavi regime.
Abbas Vaez Tabasi first arrested in 1952 and was SAVAK prison.
Abbas Vaez Tabassi first in the year 1955 Mohammad-Javad Bahonar in Rafsanjan was invited to give a speech at a ceremony to be met. Bahonar was speaking before a meeting with our issues raised in speeches were over. After the speech, he was banned from speech.

References

External links

1935 births
2016 deaths
Iranian ayatollahs
Iranian businesspeople
Members of the Expediency Discernment Council
Members of the Assembly of Experts
Representatives of the Supreme Leader in the Provinces of Iran
Central Council of the Islamic Republican Party members
Burials at Imam Reza Shrine